Bhakso Harratoli is a village in Lohardaga district of Jharkhand state of India.

References

Villages in Lohardaga district